Carlos Alberto Calero Salcedo (Barranquilla, Atlántico, June 29, 1969) is a Colombian host and presenter. He was consul of Colombia in San Francisco, United States, although at the end of 2017 the Administrative Court of Cundinamarca annulled decree 1617 of October 2016, by means of which the renowned presenter had been appointed as consul of Colombia in San Francisco.

References

Living people
1969 births
Colombian male comedians
Colombian television presenters
Place of birth missing (living people)
Date of birth missing (living people)
Jorge Tadeo Lozano University alumni